Nick Sullivan (born 25 February 1998) is an Australian professional footballer who plays as a central midfielder for Sutherland Sharks.

Career

Western Sydney Wanderers
On 7 August 2019, Sullivan made his professional debut against Perth Glory in the FFA Cup, replacing the injured Kosta Grozos in the 21st minute, the Wanderers going on to win the match 2–1 in extra-time.

References

External links

1998 births
Living people
Australian soccer players
Association football midfielders
Sutherland Sharks FC players
Club Brugge KV players
Vitória F.C. players
C.D. Cova da Piedade players
Western Sydney Wanderers FC players
Perth Glory FC players